Love Song for Joyce is a 1958 début novel by Lois Duncan, under the pen name Lois Kerry. The plot follows a young woman's struggle transitioning from adolescence to adulthood after moving from her hometown in Florida to attend a North Carolina college. The plot appears to be semi-autobiographical, bearing similarities to Duncan's own life.

Plot
Joyce Arnold is a young woman in Florida who relocates from her hometown to North Carolina to attend Deton College. Her close friend Margo, and boyfriend, Frank, have both chosen to enroll in universities in Florida. Upon her relocation to North Carolina, Joyce is forced into an entirely new environment, and must learn to navigate adulthood and her own newfound independence.

Notes

References

External links
Love Song for Joyce at Google Books

1958 American novels
American bildungsromans
Novels by Lois Duncan
Novels set in North Carolina
Works published under a pseudonym
1958 debut novels
Funk & Wagnalls books